Miles Branch is a  long first-order tributary to Marshyhope Creek in Dorchester County, Maryland.  For part of its length, this stream forms the boundary of Caroline and Dorchester Counties.

Course

Watershed
Miles Branch drains  of area, receives about 44.6 in/year of precipitation, and is about 13.57% forested.

See also
List of Maryland rivers

References

Rivers of Maryland
Rivers of Caroline County, Maryland
Rivers of Dorchester County, Maryland
Tributaries of the Nanticoke River